Omar Rodriguez Saludes is a well known Cuban dissent journalist. He was sentenced to 27 years in jail.

According to his wife, his cell conditions are very bad. There is no light in his cell and he has to suffer from mosquitoes.

References

Cuban journalists
Male journalists
Cuban dissidents
Living people
Year of birth missing (living people)